The Bombardier CRJ700, CRJ900, and CRJ1000 are a family of regional jet airliners that were designed and manufactured by Canadian transportation conglomerate Bombardier (formerly Canadair) between 1999 and 2020. Their design was derived from the smaller CRJ100 and 200 airliners, the other members of the Bombardier CRJ aircraft family. The CRJ program was acquired by Japanese corporation Mitsubishi Heavy Industries in 2020, which ended production of the aircraft.

During the 1990s, Bombardier initiated development on the CRJ-X, a program to produce enlarged derivatives of its popular CRJ100/200 family. Officially launched in 1997, the CRJ700's maiden flight took place on 27 May 1999; it was soon followed by the stretched CRJ900 variant. Several additional variants of the type were subsequently introduced, including the elongated CRJ1000 and the CRJ550 and CRJ705 which were modified to comply with scope clauses. Competitors included the British Aerospace 146, the Embraer E-Jet family, the Fokker 70 and the Fokker 100.

In Bombardier's lineup, the CRJ Series was formerly marketed alongside a family of larger jets, the CSeries (now majority-owned by Airbus and marketed as the Airbus A220), and a twin-turboprop, the QSeries (now owned by De Havilland Canada and marketed as the Dash 8). During the late 2010s, Bombardier sought to sell off several of its aircraft programs. The CRJ program was acquired by Mitsubishi Heavy Industries in a deal that closed 1 June 2020. Bombardier continued to manufacture aircraft at the Mirabel facility until the order backlog was completed in December 2020. Mitsubishi will continue to manufacture parts for existing CRJ operators but does not plan to sell or build any new CRJ aircraft, and will focus instead on their SpaceJet aircraft.

Development

Origins 
During the early 1990s, Bombardier Aerospace became interested in developing larger variants of the CRJ100/200 series; associated design work commenced in 1994. The CRJ-X, as the new range was initially designated, sought to compete with larger regional jets such as the Fokker 70/Fokker 100 or the BAe 146 family. The CRJ-X featured a stretched fuselage, a lengthened wing and up-rated General Electric CF34-8C engines while maintaining a common type-rating with the basic CRJ. Leading-edge extensions and high-lift slats improved the wing performance, other aerodynamic changes included an enlarged horizontal tailfin. By March 1995, low-speed wind tunnel testing confirmed a 2,830 km (1,530 nm) range in the 74-seat North American configuration and 2,350 km in the 72-seat European configuration. First deliveries were planned for 1999.

In 1995, the development was projected to cost around C$300 million (US$200 million). In June 1996, Bombardier selected Rockwell Collins' Pro Line 4 avionics suite. During May 1996, General Electric formally launched the previously selected CF34-8C variant. Extensive redesigning resulted in the CRJ700 retaining only 15% of the CRJ200 airframe. The CRJ-X launch was delayed by several months, due to negotiations with suppliers and subcontractors. During September 1996, Bombardier's board authorised sales of the CRJ-X. During January 1997, the CRJ-X was officially launched.

Launch 
During September 1998, Bombardier also studied an all-new 90-seat BRJ-X model. The company later shelved it for a less expensive, stretched CRJ-X, later designated CRJ900, while the original CRJ-X was designated as the CRJ700. The CRJ700 incorporated several CRJ900 features, such as its revised wing and avionics improvements. The CRJ700 and CRJ900 share a type rating, permitting cross-crew qualification via a three-day course.

In March 1997, four prototypes were planned for the CRJ700's flight test program. On 27 May 1999, the first prototype CRJ700 made its maiden flight. At this point, type certification was expected for 2001. By 1999, Bombardier had invested C$650 million (US$440 million) to develop the 70-seat CRJ700, and was set to invest a further C$200 million to develop the CRJ900, stretched to 90 seats; the CRJ700 was listed at $24–25 million then, while the larger CRJ900 was priced at $28–29 million. During May 2000, the CRJ900's launch was delayed for contract negotiations while the certification remained on-track. In July 2000, the CRJ900 was formally launched. The enlarged model was targeted at existing CRJ200/CRJ700 customers looking for larger airliners.

A new final assembly facility was established at Montréal-Mirabel International Airport as the CRJ100/200's existing line had insufficient capacity. In January 2001, Transport Canada granted the CRJ700 its type approval. In May 2001, American FAA certification for the CRJ700 was close but required two minor avionics-related changes. During October 2000, one of the CRJ700 prototypes was being converted to represent the CRJ900 configuration, later joined by a second purpose-built test aircraft. On 21 February 2001, the maiden flight of the CRJ900 took place five months ahead of schedule. By March 2002, the CRJ900 was anticipated to enter service in 2003.

Further development 

During 2007, Bombardier launched the CRJ900 NextGen to replace the initial version. Its improvements and conic nozzle enhances fuel economy by 5.5%. The new model has improved economics and a new cabin common to the CRJ700 NextGen and CRJ1000 NextGen. Mesaba Aviation (now Endeavor Air), operating at the time as Northwest Airlink (now Delta Connection), was the launch customer, and remains the largest operator of the CRJ900 NextGen. The Endeavor fleet of CRJ900 NextGen aircraft are configured in a two class seating configuration, with 12 first class seats and 64 coach seats.

During 2008, the CRJ700 was replaced by the CRJ700 NextGen, which featured improved economics and a revised cabin common to the CRJ900 NextGen and CRJ1000 NextGen. In January 2011, SkyWest Airlines ordered four CRJ700 NextGen aircraft.

During 2016, Bombardier began offering a modernized cabin design for the CRJ Series; this cabin provided a more spacious entryway, larger overhead bins, larger windows situated higher upon the fuselage, newer seats, larger lavatories, and upgraded lighting. Around this time, Maintenance intervals were also extended to 800/8,000 hours. From summer 2018, A checks were performed every 800 flight hours while C checks occurred every 8,000 flight hours. Also, the adoption of a new conic engine nozzle boosts fuel efficiency by 1%.

Over its production life, the CRJ family has latterly competed with the Embraer E-Jet family. A re-engining of the CRJ, akin to the rival Embraer E-Jet E2, with newer and more efficient engines, such as the GE Passport, to replace the current GE CF34 powerplants, would be unlikely to overcome the certification expense, primarily as newer engines are larger and heavier, eroding fuel burn improvements that would be achieved on short regional routes.

Sales history 
During April 2000, a substantial early order, valued at $10 billion, for the CRJ700 (and CRJ200) was issued by Delta Air Lines, involving 500 aircraft along with options for 406 more. Comair, operating as Delta Connection, placed an order of 14 CRJ900s; by November 2007, 6 of these had entered revenue service. Comair's aircraft feature a two–class seating configuration, comprising 12 first class seats and 64 coach seats; this is reportedly due to a limitation in Delta's contract with its pilots, limiting its regional carriers to flying aircraft with a maximum capacity of 76 seats.

During September 2011, PLUNA received its eleventh airplane (from an eventual total order of 15 with options). Estonian Air ordered 3 CRJ900 NextGen 88-seat aircraft. Also, SAS ordered 13 of these in March 2008. Iraqi Airways has ordered six Bombardier CRJ900 NextGen airliners and options on a further four of the type. In June 2010, Lufthansa ordered eight CRJ900 NextGen. In December 2012, Delta Air Lines ordered 40 CRJ900 NextGen worth $1.89 billion with 30 options.

During February 2012, Garuda Indonesia ordered six CRJ1000s and took options for another 18. The Danish lessor Nordic Aviation Capital also ordered 12 for Garuda to operate with delivery beginning in 2012.

According to Bombardier, by 2015 the CRJ series accounted for over 20% of all jet departures in North America; globally, the family operates in excess of 200,000 flights per month. Bombardier expected the 60–100-seat airliner market to represent 5,500 aircraft from 2018 through 2037.

Divestment 
, following Bombardier's decisions to sell the CSeries to Airbus and the Q Series to Viking Air, the company was looking at "strategic options" to return the CRJ to profitability. Analysts suspected that it may decide to exit the commercial aircraft market altogether and refocus on business aircraft.

On 25 June 2019 Bombardier announced a deal to sell the CRJ program to Mitsubishi Heavy Industries, the parent company of Mitsubishi Aircraft Corporation which was developing the SpaceJet. Mitsubishi had a historic interest in the CRJ program, having sounded out risk-sharing options with Bombardier, and were at one point expected to take a stake in the venture during the 1990s. Bombardier has stopped taking new sales; production of the CRJ was to continue at Mirabel until the order backlog was complete, with final deliveries then expected in the second half of 2020. The deal is to include the type certificate for the CRJ series; Bombardier is working with Transport Canada to separate the CRJ certificate from that of the Challenger.

Closure of the deal was confirmed on 1 June 2020, with Bombardier's service and support activities transferred to a new Montreal-based company, MHI RJ Aviation Group. MHI RJ has not renamed the aircraft, and its website refers simply to the "CRJ Series".

End of production 
The final CRJ to be produced, a CRJ900, finished production and was delivered to SkyWest Airlines on 28 February 2021.

Variants

CRJ700 

Design work on the CRJ700 by Bombardier started in 1995 and the program was officially launched in January 1997. The CRJ700 is a stretched derivative of the CRJ200. The CRJ700 features a new wing with leading edge slats and a stretched and slightly widened fuselage, with a lowered floor. Its first flight took place on 27 May 1999. The aircraft's FAA Type Certificate designation is the CL-600-2C10. The CRJ700 first entered commercial service with Brit Air in 2001.

Seating ranges from 63 to 78.  The CRJ700 comes in three versions: Series 700, Series 701, and Series 702. The Series 700 is limited to 68 passengers, the 701 to 70 passengers, and the 702 to 78 passengers. The CRJ700 also has three fuel/weight options: standard, ER, and LR. The ER version has an increase in fuel capacity as well as maximum weight, which in turn increases the range. The LR increases those values further. The executive version is marketed as the Challenger 870.  The CRJ700 directly competes with the Embraer 170, which typically seats 70 passengers.

The early build aircraft were equipped with two General Electric CF34-8C1 engines. However, later-build aircraft are now equipped as standard with the -8C5 model, which is essentially an uprated 8C1. Most airlines have replaced the older engines with the newer model, while a few have kept the older -8C1 in their fleet.

CRJ550 

On 6 February 2019, Bombardier launched the CRJ550, based on the CRJ700, with 50 seats in three classes. The launch customer, United Airlines, ordered 50 aircraft configured with 10 first class, 20 Economy Plus and 20 economy seats. The aircraft are operated under the United Express brand by regional partner GoJet Airlines. The CRJ550 has a lower maximum takeoff weight (MTOW) than the CRJ700, to comply with scope clauses in US pilot contracts, and a lower maximum landing weight (MLW). It received type certification in the second half of 2019. The initial 50 aircraft will be sourced from existing CRJ700s, rather than being newly constructed. On 7 August 2019, United Airlines' regional partner GoJet Airlines took delivery of the aircraft and began with a crew familiarization flight to Chicago-O’Hare International Airport (ORD).

CRJ900 

The CRJ900 is a stretched 76–90 seat version of the CRJ700. The first CRJ900 (C-FRJX) was modified from the prototype CRJ700 by adding longer fuselage plugs fore and aft of the wings. It was later converted into the prototype CRJ1000 by replacing the fuselage plugs with longer plugs. The CRJ900 also features strakes located at the rear of the plane. The CRJ900 competes with the Embraer 175, and is more efficient per seat-mile, according to Bombardier. Mesa Air Group was the launch customer for the CRJ900 painted in America West livery.  The FAA Type Certificate designation of the CRJ900 is the CL-600-2D24.

The wing is wider with added leading edge slats, the tail is redesigned with more span and anhedral.  The cabin floor has been lowered 2 inches which gains outward visibility from the windows in the cabin as the windows become closer to eye level height. The cabin has a recirculation fan which aids in cooling and heating. The environmental packs have a target temperature instead of a hot-cold knob. The APU is a Honeywell RE220 unit, which supplies much more air to the AC packs and has higher limits for starting and altitude usage.

The aircraft features two GE CF34-8C5 engines,  thrust with APR. The engines are controlled by FADEC digital engine control instead of control cables and a fuel control unit. In typical service, the CRJ900 can cruise 8–10,000 ft higher with a slightly higher fuel burn and an average true airspeed of 450–500 knots, a significant improvement over its predecessor. Its maximum ground takeoff weight is 84,500 pounds.

In 2018, the CRJ900's list price was $48 million while its market value was $24M; reportedly, most customers are paying around $20–22M and the American Airlines order for 15 was at below $20M. A six-year old aircraft of 2012 was worth less than $14M and it was to fall by 30% in 2021.

CRJ705 

The CRJ700 Series 705 is based on the CRJ900, featuring a business class cabin and a reduced maximum seating capacity to allow operation with regional airlines. The Series 705 seats 75 passengers. Some regional airlines have scope clauses with their major airlines that limit the maximum passenger capacity of aircraft they operate. The Air Canada Pilots Association negotiated a scope agreement with Air Canada limiting the maximum seating capacity of any jet aircraft at Air Canada Express to 75 seats. Air Canada Jazz was the launch customer for this aircraft in 2005 with 10 Executive Class and 65 Economy Class seats, all fitted with personal audio/video-on-demand systems. The FAA Type Certificate designation of the CRJ705 is the CL-600-2D15. Jazz Aviation, a subsidiary of Chorus Aviation, operated 16 CRJ705s on behalf of Air Canada and was the only operator of this version. On 26 April 2016, Jazz Aviation announced that existing CRJ705 aircraft in operation will be converted to CRJ900 with 76 seats. As of late February 2018, all CRJ-705s have been reconfigured with 12 Business Class and 64 Economy Class seats, which changed their FAA Type Certificate to CL-600-2D24.

CRJ1000 

On 19 February 2007, Bombardier launched the development of the CRJ1000, previously designated CRJ900X, as a stretched CRJ900, with up to 100 seats. The CRJ1000 completed its first production flight on 28 July 2009 in Montreal; the entry into service was planned for the first quarter of 2010. A month after the first flight, however, a fault in the rudder controls forced the flight-test program to be grounded : the program was not resumed until February 2010, and deliveries were projected to begin by January 2011. Brit Air and Air Nostrum were the launch customers for the CRJ1000.

Bombardier Aerospace announced on 10 November 2010 that its 100-seat CRJ1000 was awarded Aircraft Type Certificates from Transport Canada and European Aviation Safety Agency, allowing for deliveries to begin. On 14 December 2010, Bombardier began CRJ1000 deliveries to Brit Air and Air Nostrum. On 23 December 2010, it was announced that the Federal Aviation Administration had also awarded a type certificate, allowing the CRJ1000 to operate in US airspace. It has a separate type rating. Bombardier states that it offers better performance and a higher profit per seat than the competing Embraer E-190.
The FAA Type Certificate designation of the CRJ1000 is the CL-600-2E25.

In 2018, a new CRJ1000 discounted price is $M, a 2015 model is valued $22.0M, a 2010 one is worth $15.5M for a $155,000 monthly lease, and it will be $12.0M in 2021 for a $145,000 monthly lease while its D Check costs $800,000 and its engine overhaul costs $0.9 to 2.4M.

Operators 

As of July 2018, 290 CRJ700 aircraft (all variants), 425 CRJ900 aircraft (all variants) and 62 CRJ1000 aircraft were in airline service with SkyWest Airlines (123), Endeavor Air (112), PSA Airlines (95), Mesa Airlines (84), GoJet Airlines (54), ExpressJet Airlines (39), Lufthansa CityLine (37), China Express Airlines (36), Jazz Aviation LP (35), Scandinavian Airlines (26), HOP! (25), Air Nostrum (23), Envoy Air (20), Garuda Indonesia (18), and other operators with fewer aircraft of the type.

Deliveries 

Data as of 1 January 2021.

Specifications

See also

Popular culture 
In 2006, the CRJ700 was featured in Microsoft Flight Simulator X as one of the demo aircraft.

Notes

References

External links 

 MHI RJ Aviation – CRJ Series page
 

1990s Canadian airliners
CRJ700
Twinjets
T-tail aircraft
Aircraft first flown in 1999